Japanese land law is the law of real property in Japan. Nationwide, city land law began in 1919. This was completely revised in more detail in 1968, focusing on City Planning Areas. The concept of zoning was introduced to all of Japan beginning with the Land-Use Law in 1974 (modelled on the German land planning system); this was later integrated into City Planning Areas. After 2011, decentralisation policy delegated the power to create a land-use plan without needing approval from the central government.

Land Tax Reform (1873)
The Land Tax Reform of 1873 was the first modern land law, and contributed to the economic growth of the Meiji period, destroying the old economic and social system and creating the new system. The law increased tax revenue and boosted farm productivity by issuing the title deeds to buy and sell land freely. A total of 109.33 million landownership certificates were issued in 1876.

Tokyo City Improvement Ordinance (1888)
The first modern Japanese land law, the Tokyo City Improvement Ordinance ('shiku kaisei'), was enacted in 1888, but had been in preparation since 1876. It targetes infrastructure development including major streets and water works to prevent epidemics in Tokyo. The projects took over 30 years, completed in 1918.

Old City Planning Law (1919)
Because the need of the development outside of Tokyo by a rapid industrialization and urbanization, there was demand came from other large cities and from the architectural profession around 1917 to institutionalize a planning system for whole nation. The government then created the City Planning Section (toshi keikaku) in the Home Ministry, led by the first Section chief, Ikeda Hiroshi. He drafted the Old City Planning Law which enacted in 1919, later called 'Old Law' or 'Old City Planning Law', along with the Urban Building Law (shigaichi kenchikubutsu).

1923 Great Kantō earthquake almost completely destroyed the Tokyo area, the Reconstruction Agency was then created to reconstruct Tokyo and Yokohama within 7 years. The Old City Planning Law provided zoning, building-line control, and land consolidation, which by the end of 1930, applied to more than 100 cities.

After the World War II, the militarism-source Home Ministry was denounced and replaced by the Ministry of Construction in 1948. The Urban Building Law was also replaced by the Building Standard Law (kenchiku kijun ho).

New City Planning Law (1968)
Economic miracle in Japan from 1950s filled the major metropolitan areas with material prosperity such as high-rise office buildings, sprawl of suburban devepment, heavy industrial plants, highway systems, Bullet Train lines, new towns, and golf courses. Land prices soared but an environment was deteriorated, traffic congestion, and failure of trunk road system with urban expansion. 'Old Law' was then replaced by the City Planning Law of 1968, called 'New Law'. Anyway, its basic framework was hardly changed.

New City Planning Law is the foundation of city plans, land-use regulations, construction regulations, and activities related to city facilities. It works in concurrence with other land-use laws to regulate land use in Japan, setting standards for items such as the structure of city plans, and city master planning projects and activities, promoting balance developments of national lands in which contributes to public welfare. It has three fundamental principles, firstly, a sound harmonization of urbanization with agricultural, forestry, and fisheries industries, secondly, a secure healthy and cultural urban condition and functional urban life, thirdly, a reasonable planning of land. It introduces, the City Planning Area (CPA) concept, designation of areas to discourage developments, restrictive permission of developments, the partial delegation of planning powers to prefectural and municipal governments, procedures for citizen participation.

The New Urban Redevelopment Law (1969) combined former and new redevelopment programmes into 'New Law'. The Building Standard Law was also revised twice to remove the limit of building heights and to allow more detailed zoning control.

The Local Autonomy Act was also revised in 1969 that required local governments to produce a forward-looking Basic Plan (kihon keikaku) for their long-term economic and social development, to cover a duration of around 25 years. It has to be approved by the elected local council as part of a comprehensive planning that tied to the local fiscal decision.

City Planning Area
The area of the City Planning Law, called the City Planning Area (CPA) is the largest and the primary zone classification in Japan. It is critical for the potential development of any large land area that covers approximately 25% of the land in Japan. Most development in Japan occurs within the CPA, because outside of the CPA, the development is highly restricted. The person in charge to designate the CPA is prefectural governors, after a consultation with municipal mayors and deliberation councils. The CPA usually has to be approved by the Ministry of Land, Infrastructure, Transport and Tourism (MLIT), but if the CPA combined two of more prefectures, the MLIT can designate the CPA instead.

Proposes of the City Planning Area are firstly, to designate the Area Division, secondly, to be available for the development permissions, thirdly, to apply the group rule stipulated for the relationship between buildings and cities in the Building Standard Law. Other reason for the CPA is to be specified to make public investments more efficient and support the land use with valid reason. It is not always a whole municipality but there are 4 cases depends on the situation of municipalities, applying to 100% of one administrative area, applying to 100% of many administrative areas, applying to part (below 100%) of one administrative area, applying to part (below 100%) of many administrative areas.

Main areas
Large urban cities are defined by five specific definitions to apply the CPA such as a city that has more than 10,000 people in the municipality and 50% of workers involve in commerce and industry business, a city that expected to meet 10,000 people in 10 years, a city that has the central area of the municipality has over 3,000 people, a city that has tourism municipality that needs a development, a city that has disaster ruined municipality that needs a recovering help. Large urban cities within those five points are mandatory to divide the city into two areas, the Urbanization Promoting Area (UPA) and the Urbanisation Control Area (UCA). This method helps the public investments to be more effective, limit Urban sprawl. Small cities are not mandatory to divide the area but called the Unzoned Area (UA). The development of the UPA, the UCA, and the UA is to prevent erratic developments in the urban fringe. Zoning and development is legal anywhere between three areas, but in reality, the majority occurs in the UPA where the process is easiest.

 The Urbanization Promotion Area (UPA) is clarified as an area which already forms urban area and shall be urbanized specifically and systematically within about 10 years. Public facilities such as streets and sewage system are given priority for implementation in the UPA.
 The Urbanisation Control Area (UCA) is clarified as an area which shall be controlled its urbanization. Building plan development in the UCA is not allowed in principle.
 Unzoned Area, for small cities, sometimes referred to as misenbiki areas.

Sub areas
In 1980, the law was amended to make more micro plan and bottom-up approach to city planning, using German planning system, B Plans.
It anchored by municipalities and citizens, the system are flexible and citizens can participate. There are approximately thirty types of sub zones within the CPA, local governments can choose any of them when planning and zoning.

Land Use Zones
Twelve of thirty sub zones, the Land Use Zones, is a building control on land which regulates land use and building form, consist of 8 types of residential districts, 2 types of commercial districts, 3 types of industrial districts that mostly prepared in the UPA. For example, hotels cannot be built in low density residential district. Each district regulation is decided by the building coverage, floor-space ratio, height limitation, floor-space ratio limitation of road, diagonal line limitation for road and adjacent land, and shadow area limitation. All of criteria are related to the Building Standard Act.

There are 13 land use zones.

Overlay Zones
Four zones in the Overlay Zones that only be permitted only on top of the 12 Land Use Zonings. Municipal major designate these overlay zones.

Specialized Zones
These special zones are legally permissible anywhere inside the CPA.

Promotion Area zone

District Plans
District Plans are detailed neighborhood-scale planning, that aimed at accommodating or promoting high rise residences, urban redevelopment, fire and noise prevention, and implementation of floor-to-area ratios (FARs) and transferable development right (TDR) systems. In addition to these six fundamental categories, local governments can create different sub-categories.

City Planning Projects
City Planning Projects are allowed only in the UPA in general except the Promotion Area Zones.

Government jurisdiction over designation of zoning
According to 2011 data by Shibata, there are clear scope of jurisdiction from the central government to local governments.

Land Use Law (1974)
The reason of the Land-Use Law enacted in 1974 was concentration of population and industry in major cities, speculative land investment, abnormally high land prices, and chaotic development. To solve these problem, it has fundamental principles, firstly,  the public welfare is above all considerations, secondly, there must be a planning for natural resource preservation, thirdly, healthy and cultural living environments must be protected, fourthly, there must be planning for balanced development of land use.

In 1987, the Land Transaction Surveillance system was added into the Land Use Law to watch land transaction or transfer within prefecture. The governor has the power to issue a document to prohibit a highly speculative transaction with this law. However, local governments do not have legal power to stop any transactions, but there is a public announment which can deterrence further speculative.

National Plan, Prefecture Plan, Municipal Plan
All three levels of government, national, prefecture, and municipal are all involved with the law. It requires all three levels of government to create plans for uses of national lands. Starting with the National Land-Use Plan or the National Plan that was prepared by the Ministry of Land, Infrastructure, Transport and Tourism, then it must be approved by the Cabinet. Based on the National Plan, there are the Prefecture Plans. Based on the Prefecture Plan, there are the Municipal Plans.

Basic Land-Use Plan
Prefecture governments must create the Basic Land-Use Plan (BLP), based on the Prefecture Plan. The BLP specifies the five zonings, similar to sub zones of the City Planning Law but in bigger scale. Different laws apply on these five zones and they can be overlapped, more than one zones can be designated in one area.

Decentralisation
After the Decentralisation in Japan started, in 2011, the BLP does not need to be approved by the Prime Minister anymore, it changed from 'approval' to 'consult with' the Ministry of Land, Infrastructure, Transport and Tourism instead. In 2009, the Decentralization Reform Promotion Committee recommended to change from 'consult with' to 'hearing opinion' instead. Finally in 2011, there is no need to consult with central government anymore, but it is necessary to consult with, because of high level of planning technical issue.

Basic Law for Land (1989)
Japan had become an economic superpower affecting land-specific problems, which included "large increases in land prices, government difficulties in acquiring land for public facilities and infrastructure, and chaotic urban development."

In 1988, the Ordinary Administrative Reform Propulsion Discussion Committee submitted the report on Measures for Land Prices and Other Issues to the Prime Minister, commented that there were unfair advantage on land speculation. High land prices by land speculation, called profiteering, reportedly influenced the Diet members who drafted the Basic Law for Land (BLL) or Shibata called it the Fundamental Land Law.

The main purpose of the BLL is to establish the fundamental principles of land-use. Firstly, public interests in land are superior to private interests. Secondly, land-uses shall be in accordance with uses appropriate to an area's natural, social, economic, and cultural conditions. Thirdly, speculative investments in land shall be restrained. Forthly, "appropriate burdens" shall be placed on parties profiteering from increases in land prices.

The BLL does not effect individual rights by itself but it is the foundation for more specific land laws, such as the Aggregate Control of Real Estate-Related Loans Law. Furthermore, land taxation and land price control are allowed. The central government and local governments are authorized by BLL Article 14 to place appropriate burden on parties profiting from "social capital" services.

Notes

References
Articles

 
 
 
 
 
 

Reports
 
 

Urban planning in Japan
Law of Japan
Legal history of Japan
Economy of Japan
Land law